Agonandra macrocarpa is a species of plant in the family Opiliaceae. It is found in Costa Rica and Honduras. It is threatened by habitat loss.

References

Opiliaceae
Vulnerable plants
Taxonomy articles created by Polbot